Karan-e Sofla (also Romanized as Karān-e Soflá and Karān Soflá; also known as Ashāghi Karan, Karān-e Pā’īn, Karrān, Karrān-e Pā’īn, Karrān-e Vasaţ, Kerān-e Pā’īn, and Kerān Pā’īn) is a village in Baba Jik Rural District, in the Central District of Chaldoran County, West Azerbaijan Province, Iran. At the 2006 census, its population was 71, in 12 families.

References 

Populated places in Chaldoran County